is the second indie single released by Japanese pop rock band Scandal. It was limited to 2,000 copies, came in a CD+DVD format only, and was exclusive to Tower Records in Japan. It was sold on Scandal's United States tour. The title track was used as the theme song for the movie "Corazon de Melon". The single reached #150 on the Oricon weekly chart and charted for two weeks, selling 686 copies. The DVD contains footage of Scandal recording "Space Ranger" in studio.

Track listing

CD

DVD

References 

2008 singles
Scandal (Japanese band) songs
Japanese film songs